Michel Langlet was a French boxer. He competed in the men's middleweight event at the 1928 Summer Olympics.

References

Year of birth missing
Year of death missing
Middleweight boxers
French male boxers
Olympic boxers of France
Boxers at the 1928 Summer Olympics
Place of birth missing